This list of outlaw country artists includes solo performers and bands.

References

Artists
Lists of musicians by genre
Lists of country musicians